Jaroslav Hübl (born October 4, 1957 in Chomutov) is a Czech former professional ice hockey player.

Between 1977 and 1993, Hübl played 12 seasons in the Czechoslovak First Ice Hockey League, mostly with HC Litvínov. In 407 league games he scored 120 goals and 126 assists for 246 points while registering 305 minutes in penalties.

His son Jaroslav (a goaltender) and nephew Viktor were also professionals in the sport.

References

1957 births
Living people
Czech ice hockey right wingers
HC Plzeň players
Sportspeople from Chomutov
Czechoslovak ice hockey right wingers
Czechoslovak expatriate sportspeople in Finland
Expatriate ice hockey players in Finland
Czechoslovak expatriate ice hockey people